Shake What God Gave Ya is the third studio album from American country music artist James Otto. It was released in the United States on September 14, 2010 through Warner Bros. Nashville. The album includes two singles, "Groovy Little Summer Song" and "Soldiers & Jesus". Prior to its release, Otto charted the single "Since You Brought It Up", which was not included on an album. Otto produced the entire album with Paul Worley, with Monty Powell as a co-producer on the title track.

Background
In an interview with The Boot, Otto described his new record saying, "This is a declaration of who I am, this country-soul sound is where we're going, and if you like it, this is for you." In an interview with Music Row, Otto called the content on the album "sexy, sultry, and soulful", and went on to say that "Musically I’d say I’m the love child between Ronnie Milsap and Barry White.”

Reception

Critical

Stephen Thomas Erlewine called it "a fully formed, seductive country-soul record" and said it "rolls smooth and easy, locking into a cool relaxed groove early on and never leaving it." Jessica Phillips with Country Weekly rated the album three-and-a-half stars out of five, saying Otto's "raw, impassioned style" brought out many soul-influenced songs, and that the album "focuses on lighthearted or romantic fare."

Greg Victor with Parcbench called it "the best country-meets-soul-meets-rock-meets-blues album to hit the scene since the early days of Lyle Lovett’s Large Band, and said the album put "Otto in a class all by himself." Allen Jacobs with Roughstock called the tracks on the album "smart, soulful and sexy country songs" and said the album was "nowhere near a traditional country record [but] is nonetheless a strong third album."

Track listing

Personnel

Musicians
Al Anderson - electric guitar solo (2)
Jim Brown - piano (10), Hammond B-3 organ (2, 3, 10), synthesizer (2)
Tyler Cain - electric guitar (7), acoustic guitar (7)
Chad Cromwell - drums (except 7 and 10)
Glen Duncan - mandolin (2, 10)
Tommy Harden - drums (10), percussion (2)
Mike Johnson - steel guitar (1, 4, 5, 6, 8, 9, 11, 12)
Doug Kahan - bass guitar (10)
Troy Lancaster - electric guitar (2, 4, 5, 6, 8-12), electric guitar solo (1, 3)
Shannon Lawson - background vocals (3, 4, 5, 7, 8, 9, 11)
Rob McNelley - (1, 4, 5, 8, 9, 11), electric guitar solo (12)
Justin Meeks - drums (7), percussion (7)
Alexander "Sasha" Ostrovsky - Dobro (7)
James Otto - vocals, electric guitar solo (6, 8)
Allison Prestwood - bass guitar (1, 4, 8)
Michael Rhodes - bass guitar (2, 3, 5, 6, 9, 11, 12)
Mike Rojas - piano (1, 4, 6), Hammond B-3 organ (1, 4, 6, 11, 12), Wurlitzer electric piano (5, 8, 11, 12), accordion (5)
Steve Sheehan - acoustic guitar (2, 3, 10), steel guitar (2, 3, 10)
Adam Shoenfeld - electric guitar (6)
Chris Stapleton - background vocals (6)
Russell Terrell - background vocals (2)
Ilya Toshinsky - banjo (7)
Biff Watson - acoustic guitar (1, 4, 5, 6, 8, 9, 11, 12)
Kyle Whalum - bass guitar (7)
Shannon Wickline - piano (9), Hammond B-3 organ (7, 9), synthesizer (7)
Paul Worley - electric guitar (5)

Strings (tracks 10 and 11)
Karen Winkelmann, Pamela Sixfin, David DAvidson, and David Angell - violin
Jim Grosjean, Monisa Angell - violas
Anthony LaMarchina, Sari Reist - cellos
Mary Kathryn VanOsdale - double bass

Technical
Ben Fowler - recording (3, 9)
Paul Hart - recording (2, 10)
Erik Hellerman - string recording (10, 11)
Carl Marsh - string arranger (10, 11)
Andrew Mendelson - mastering
James Otto - producer (all tracks)
Monty Powell - producer (7 only)
Clarke Schleicher - recording (1, 4, 5, 8, 11, 12), mixing (all tracks)
Trina Shoemaker - recording (6)
Matt Troja - recording (7)
Karen Winkelmann - string contractor (10, 11)
Paul Worley - producer (all tracks)

Chart performance

Album

Singles

References

2010 albums
Albums produced by Paul Worley
James Otto albums
Warner Records albums